This article is about music-related events in 1877.

Events 
March 4 (February 20 O.S.) – The premiere of the ballet Swan Lake («Лебединое озеро», Lebedinoye ozero) with score by Peter Ilyich Tchaikovsky is given at the Bolshoi Theatre in Moscow. It is not well received at this performance although remains in the repertory.
April 27 - Jules Massenet's opera Le Roi de Lahore premiers in Paris
April 30 – French poet Charles Cros describes a method of recording sound, the Paleophone.
May 7 – 29 – Wagner Festival at the Royal Albert Hall in London. Richard Wagner conducts some of his own works and Hans Richter makes his British conducting debut.
July 18 (July 6 O.S.) – Peter Ilyich Tchaikovsky marries Antonina Milyukova in Moscow. After 6 weeks, the couple separate permanently.
November 21 – Thomas Edison announces his invention of the phonograph in the United States.
December 30 – The premiere of Brahms' Symphony No. 2 is given in Vienna by the Vienna Philharmonic under the direction of Hans Richter.
Ludwig Thuille and Richard Strauss meet as students at Innsbruck. They become lifelong friends.

Published popular music 
 "Abdul Abulbul Amir"     w.m. Percy French
 "Captain Cuff"     w.m. G. W. Hunt
 "Chopsticks"     m. Arthur de Lulli
 "Dear Old Pals"     w.m. G. W. Hunt
 "Early In De Mornin'"     w.m. Will Hays
 "In The Gloaming" w. Meta Orred m. Annie Fortescue Harrison (Words 1874)
 "Little Daisy's Request" by Arabella M. Root
 "The Lost Chord"     w. Adelaide Anne Procter m. Sir Arthur Sullivan (Words 1858)
 "My Name Is John Wellington Wells"     w. W. S. Gilbert m. Arthur Sullivan
 "Out of Work" Septimus Winner
 "Phelim O'Toole" by Harry Banks
 "Time Was When Love And I Were Well Acquainted"     w. W. S. Gilbert m. Arthur Sullivan

Classical music 
Johannes Brahms – Symphony No. 2, Op. 73 in D
Anton Bruckner – Symphony No. 3 in D minor (Novak edition)
Felix Draeseke – Fata Morgana, Op. 13
Antonín Dvořák – String Quartet No. 9, Op. 34 in D minor
Robert Fuchs – Violin Sonata No. 1, Op. 20 in F minor
Karl Goldmark – Violin Concerto No. 1, Op. 28 in A minor
Theodor Kirchner – 4 Notturnos, Op.28
Ignaz Lachner – 3 Charakterstücke, Op.83
Franz Liszt – Les Jeux d'eaux à la Villa d'Este for piano.
Giuseppe Martucci – Piano Quintet, Op.45
Jules Massenet – Aubade
Leon Minkus – La Bayadère (ballet)
Joachim Raff – Violin Concerto No. 2, Op. 206 in A minor
Josef Rheinberger – Violin Sonata No. 2, Op. 105 in E minor
Camille Saint-Saëns 
Piano Concerto No.4, Op.44
La Jeunesse d'Hercule, Op.50
Six Études for piano (including 'En forme de valse')
Vogue, vogue la galère
John Philip Sousa 
Myrrha Gavotte, Op.30
Across the Danube, Op.36
Richard Strauss – Piano Sonata No.1 in E major
Sergey Taneyev – Venice at Night
Pyotr Ilyich Tchaikovsky 
Francesca da Rimini, premiered March 9 in Moscow
Swan Lake (ballet)
Francis Thomé – Simple aveu, Op.25
Anton Urspruch – Deutsche Tänze, Op.7
Charles-Marie Widor – 6 Mélodies, Op.22

Opera 
Emmanuel Chabrier –  L'étoile   
Charles Gounod – Cinq-Mars, CG 10, premiered April 5 in Paris   
 Peter Heise – Monarch and Constable
 Jules Massenet – Le roi de Lahore
 Camille Saint-Saëns – Samson et Dalila
 Charles Villiers Stanford – The Veiled Prophet of Khorossan

Musical theater 
 The Chimes of Normandy, adapted from Les Cloches de Corneville, Broadway production opened at the Fifth Avenue Theatre on October 22 and ran for 16 performances
 Les Cloches de Corneville by Robert Planquette, Paris production opened at the Folies-Dramatique on April 19 and ran for 408 performances
 Le Grand Mogol, Marseilles production
 Orpheus in the Underworld by Jacques Offenbach, London revival
 The Sorcerer, Gilbert & Sullivan London production opened at the Opera Comique on November 17 and ran for 175 performances

Births 
January 12 – Maude Nugent, songwriter (d. 1958)
February 16 – Sergei Bortkiewicz, Russian composer and pianist (d. 1952)
March 4 – Aleksandr Gedike, composer (died 1957)
April 9 – Hughie Cannon, songwriter (died 1912)
May 25 – Billy Murray, singer (d. 1954)
June 3 – Theodor Szántó, composer (died 1934)
June 8 – Thorvald Aagaard, Danish composer (d. 1937)
June 11 – Renée Vivien, lyricist (died 1901)
July 14 – Agnes Nicholls, operatic soprano (d. 1959)
July 17 – Edward Madden, American lyricist (d. 1952)
July 24 – Percy Scholes, English musicologist (d. 1958)
July 27 – Ernő Dohnányi, Hungarian composer, conductor and pianist (d. 1960)
August 22 – Lucien Garban, French composer (died 1959)
September 6 – Buddy Bolden, ragtime musician (d. 1931)
September 7 – Petar Stojanović, violinist and composer (d. 1957))
September 15 – Daisy Wood, music hall singer (d. 1961)
September 20 – Kato van der Hoeven, Dutch cellist (d. 1959)
September 26 – Alfred Cortot, Franco-Swiss pianist (d. 1962)
October 15 – Helen Ware, stage actress (died 1939)
October 24 – Ernst Mielck, Finnish composer (d. 1899)
November 21 – Sigfrid Karg-Elert,  German composer (d. 1933)
December 27 – Otto Gauß, organist (died 1970)

Deaths 
January 1 – Julie Berwald, opera singer, member of the Royal Swedish Academy of Music.
January 18 – George Tolhurst, composer (b. 1827)
March 23 – Caroline Unger, operatic contralto (b. 1803)
March 30 – Charles Neate, British pianist (born 1784)
April 7 – Errico Petrella, opera composer (b. 1813)
April 26 – Louise Bertin, composer and poet (b. 1805)
June 3 – Ludwig Ritter von Köchel, cataloguer of the works of Mozart (b. 1800)
June 13 – Cesare Ciardi, flautist and composer (b. 1818)
June 24 – Emilie Edie von Kalchberg, lyricist (born 1796)
June 29 – Clorinda Corradi, operatic contralto (b. 1804)
August 5 – Luigi Legnani, guitarist and composer (b. 1790)
September 12 – Julius Rietz, German cellist, composer and teacher, editor of an edition of Mendelssohn's complete works (b. 1812)
October 3 – Thérèse Tietjens, operatic soprano (b. 1831)
October 16 – Théodore Barrière, librettist (born 1823)

References 

 
19th century in music
Music by year